The 1947 Arizona Wildcats football team represented the University of Arizona in the Border Conference during the 1947 college football season.  In their seventh season under head coach Mike Casteel, the Wildcats compiled a 5–4–1 record (3–2 against Border opponents), finished in fourth place in the conference, and were outscored by their opponents, 241 to 233. The team captain was Fred Knez.  The team played its home games in Arizona Stadium in Tucson, Arizona.

Fred Enke led the team with 1,406 passing yards (88 of 184 passing) and 538 net rushing yards on 146 carries. His combined tally of 1,944 yards of total offense was the best in the country. See List of NCAA major college football yearly total offense leaders.

Schedule

References

Arizona
Arizona Wildcats football seasons
Arizona Wildcats football